ISO 3166-2 is part of the ISO 3166 standard published by the International Organization for Standardization (ISO), and defines codes for identifying the principal subdivisions (e.g., provinces or states) of all countries coded in ISO 3166-1. The official name of the standard is Codes for the representation of names of countries and their subdivisions – Part 2: Country subdivision code. It was first published in 1998.

The purpose of ISO 3166-2 is to establish an international standard of short and unique alphanumeric codes to represent the relevant administrative divisions and dependent territories of all countries in a more convenient and less ambiguous form than their full names. Each complete ISO 3166-2 code consists of two parts, separated by a hyphen:
 The first part is the ISO 3166-1 alpha-2 code of the country;
 The second part is a string of up to three alphanumeric characters, which is usually obtained from national sources and stems from coding systems already in use in the country concerned, but may also be developed by the ISO itself.

Each complete ISO 3166-2 code can then be used to uniquely identify a country subdivision in a global context.

 there are 5,043 codes defined in ISO 3166-2. For some countries, codes are defined for more than one level of subdivisions.

Current codes
The following table can be used to access the current ISO 3166-2 codes of each country, and comprises three columns:

 Entry: ISO 3166-1 alpha-2 code, click to view the ISO 3166-2 codes of the country
 Country name: English short name officially used by the ISO 3166 Maintenance Agency (ISO 3166/MA)
 Subdivisions assigned codes: Number and category of subdivisions assigned codes in ISO 3166-2; if there are more than one level of subdivisions, the first-level subdivisions are shown in italics

Subdivisions included in ISO 3166-1
For the following countries, a number of their subdivisions in ISO 3166-2, most of them dependent territories, are also officially assigned their own country codes in ISO 3166-1:

 Notes

Format
The format of the ISO 3166-2 codes is different for each country. The codes may be alphabetic, numeric, or alphanumeric, and they may also be of constant or variable length. The following is a table of the ISO 3166-2 codes of each country (those with codes defined), grouped by their format:

Changes
The ISO 3166/MA updates ISO 3166-2 when necessary. Changes in ISO 3166-2 consist mostly of spelling corrections, addition and deletion of subdivisions, and modification of the administrative structure.

ISO used to announce changes in newsletters which updated the currently valid standard, and releasing new editions which comprise a consolidation of newsletter changes. As of July 2013, changes are published in the online catalogue of ISO only and no newsletters are published anymore. Past newsletters remain available on the ISO website.

See also

 International Organization for Standardization
 ISO 3166
 ISO 3166-1
 ISO 3166-2
 ISO 3166-3
 List of ISO 3166 country codes
 Lists of countries and territories
 Sovereign state
 List of sovereign states
 List of states with limited recognition
 Dependent territory
 United Nations
 Member states of the United Nations
 United Nations list of non-self-governing territories
 Geocode

References

External links
 ISO 3166 Maintenance Agency, International Organization for Standardization (ISO)
 Country codes—Online Browsing Platform

Other lists of ISO 3166-2 codes (not necessarily up to date)
Many of the lists below are based on outdated versions of ISO 3166-2 codes. The latest version may be obtained from the ISO 3166/MA.

 List of Countries with ISO 2 Digit codes—DataHub Core Data
 Country sub-entity name code, GEFEG.FX
 .

Country subdivision codes
2
 ISO 3166-2